Two Seater and Retro Glider Aerobatic Cup Zbraslavice is a special combined aerobatic competition, held at Zbraslavice Airport in the Czech Republic. The very first competition took place in August 2013 and the second is planned to May 2014.

The objective of the competition is to compete in two special categories of glider aerobatics. Less experienced pilots (however this is not a condition) fly with two-seater training gliders – ASK21, DG Flugzeugbau DG-1000 or L-13AC – an aerobatics version of LET L-13 Blaník. In a 'retro' category, more experienced pilot fly with vintage gliders, such as LF107 Lunak and Lo-100, that are at least 50 years old. It is an open competition, pilots from all over the world can compete here.
 
First venue took place in Zbraslavice in August 2013, with 12 competitors in two seater category, and 5 solo pilots in vintage category. Those in vintage category have flown with LF 107 Lunak, or Lo 100 respectively. The winner of two seater category is David Beneš, in Retro category Milos Ramert with Lo 100. Second season of this competition took place in June 2014, after original dates had to be cancelled due to bad weather.

Third season of this competition is due to take place on June 11–14, 2015.

Links and resources 
 www.tsgac.cz – official competition website
 www.lkzb.cz – competition organiser, Flying Club Zbraslavice
 trénink s LF 107 Luňákem – Graham Saw, of Britain, during one of his training flights with LF 107 Lunak over Zbraslavice Airport

Gliding competitions
Kutná Hora District
Sports competitions in the Czech Republic